Dirty Money is the fourth studio album by American hip hop duo UGK. It was released on November 13, 2001, by Jive Records. The album came after a five-year hiatus, however, the duo had been planning on releasing this album since 1998, and ads for it appeared in some of the late 1998's Jive albums.

Track listing
Credits adapted from liner notes.

Sample credits
"Let Me See It" contains a sample from "Here We Go (Live at the Funhouse)" performed by Run-DMC.
"Choppin' Blades" contains samples from "P.S.K. - What Does It Mean?" performed by Schoolly D, and "Captain Save a Hoe" performed by E-40.
"Ain't That a Bitch (Ask Yourself)" contains a sample from "Chains and Things" performed by B.B. King.
"Like a Pimp" contains a sample from "Don't Look Any Further" performed by Dennis Edwards.
"Take It Off" contains a sample from "Love Serenade" performed by Barry White.
"Wood Wheel" contain a sample from "Love Comes in All Colors" performed by The Staple Singers.
"Money, Hoes & Power" contains a sample from "Midnight and You" performed by Love Unlimited Orchestra.

Charts

Weekly charts

Year-end charts

References

2001 albums
UGK albums
Albums produced by Bryan-Michael Cox
Albums produced by Jermaine Dupri